The 4th NKP Salve Challenger Trophy was an Indian domestic cricket tournament that was held in Mumbai from 9 October to 12 October 1997. The series involved the domestic and national players from India allocated in India Seniors, India A, and India B. India Seniors won the Challenger trophy after defeating India A by 31 runs in the final.

Squads 

 Sachin Tendulkar was excused from playing the Challenger trophy due to personal reasons.

Points Table

Matches

Group stage

Final

References 

Indian domestic cricket competitions